The UK Albums Chart is one of many music charts compiled by the Official Charts Company that calculates the best-selling albums of the week in the United Kingdom. Before 2004, the chart was only based on the sales of physical albums. This list shows albums that peaked in the Top 5 (top 10 from November) of the UK Albums Chart during 1958, as well as albums which peaked in 1957 or 1959 but were in the top 5/10 in 1958. The entry date is when the album appeared in the top 5/10 for the first time (week ending, as published by the Official Charts Company, which is six days after the chart is announced).

Thirty albums were in the top five/ten this year. Five albums from 1957 remained in the top 5 for several weeks at the beginning of the year, while Frank Sinatra Sings for Only the Lonely by Frank Sinatra, Oh Boy!: Original Television Soundtrack credited to various artists and Pack Up Your Troubles by Russ Conway were all released in 1958 but did not reach their peak until 1959. Three artists scored multiple entries in the top 5/10 in 1958. The Crickets, Ella Fitzgerald, Johnny Mathis, Perry Como and Russ Conway were among the artists who achieved their first UK charting top 5/10 album in 1958.

The 1957 Christmas number-one album, The King and I credited to various artists, remained at number one for the first eight weeks of 1958. The first new number-one album of the year was Pal Joey credited to various artists. Five different albums peaked at number-one in 1958.

Background

Multiple entries
Thirty albums charted in the top 5/10 in 1958, with twenty-three albums reaching their peak this year.

Three artists scored multiple entries in the top 5/10 in 1958. Frank Sinatra secured the record for most hit albums in 1958 with seven entries. Perry Como's two entries were both released this year.

Chart debuts
Nine artists achieved their first top 5/10 album in 1958 as a lead artist. Perry Como had two entries in his breakthrough year.

The following table (collapsed on desktop site) does not include does not include acts who had previously charted as part of a group and secured their first top 10 solo album, or featured appearances on compilations or other artists recordings.

Soundtrack albums
Cast recordings from various films and musicals made the top 5/10 this year. These included Carousel, The Duke Wore Jeans, My Fair Lady, The Pajama Game, Pal Joey and South Pacific.

Top-five albums
Key

Entries by artist
The following table shows artists who achieved two or more top 5/10 entries in 1958, including albums that reached their peak in 1957 and 1959. The figures only include main artists, with featured artists and appearances on compilation albums not counted individually for each artist. The total number of weeks an artist spent in the top five/ten in 1958 is also shown.

Notes

 Pack Up Your Troubles reached its peak of number six on 3 January 1959 (week ending).
 The Student Prince/The Great Caruso reached its peak of number four on 17 October 1959 (week ending).
 Recordings credited to Original Soundtrack by the Official Charts Company but all had different artists as featured performers.
 Rodger and Hammerstein's Oklahoma re-entered the top 5 at number 3 on 29 March 1958 (week ending) for 3 weeks and at number 5 on 26 April 1958 (week ending) for 2 weeks. It re-entered the newly expanded top 10 at number 9 on 8 November 1958 (week ending) for 2 weeks, at number 7 on 29 November 1958 (week ending) for 2 weeks and at number 10 on 20 December 1958 (week ending) for 5 weeks.
 Figure include weeks spent in the newly expanded top 10 (from 8 November 1958, week ending).
 Rodger and Hammerstein's Carousel originally peaked at number 1 upon its initial release in 1956. It re-entered the expanded top 10 at number 8 on 6 December 1958 (week ending), at number 9 on 10 January 1959 (week ending) and at number 10 on 25 April 1959 (week ending).
 The King and I re-entered the top 5 at number 5 on 9 August 1958 (week ending) and at number 5 on 23 August 1958 (week ending) for 3 weeks. It re-entered the newly expanded top 10 at number 7 on 8 November 1958 (week ending) for 15 weeks.
 A Swingin' Affair re-entered the top 5 at number 4 on 11 January 1958 (week ending).
 Songs for Swingin' Lovers originally peaked at number 1 upon its initial release in 1956. It re-entered the top 5 at number 4 on 4 January 1958 (week ending) for 4 weeks, at number 5 on 15 February 1958 (week ending) for 10 weeks and at number 9 on 15 November 1958 (week ending).
 The Pajama Game re-entered the top 5 at number 3 on 5 April 1958 (week ending) and at number 4 on 19 April 1958 (week ending) for 2 weeks.
 The Duke Wore Jeans re-entered the top 5 at number 5 on 5 July 1958 (week ending).
 We Get Letters (Volume 2) re-entered the top 5 at number 5 on 26 July 1958 (week ending) for 4 weeks.
 Elvis' Golden Records re-entered the newly expanded top 10 at number 8 on 11 April 1959 (week ending) for 3 weeks, at number 10 on 23 May 1959 (week ending), at number 9 on 13 June 1959 (week ending) for 8 weeks and at number 9 on 29 August 1959 (week ending).
 Dear Perry re-entered the top 10 at number 6 on 6 December 1958 (week ending) for 2 weeks.
 Songs by Tom Lehrer re-entered the top 10 at number 8 on 22 November 1958 (week ending) for 2 weeks.
 Pack Up Your Troubles re-entered the top 10 at number 10 at number 9 on 20 December 1958 (week ending) for 3 weeks
 Frank Sinatra Sings For Only the Lonely re-entered the top 10 at number 9 on 28 March 1959 (week ending).
 Figure includes album that peaked in 1957.
 Figure includes album that peak in 1959.

See also
1958 in British music
List of number-one albums from the 1950s (UK)

References
General

Specific

External links
1958 album chart archive at the Official Charts Company (click on relevant week)

United Kingdom top 5 albums
Top 5 albums
1958